1600 meters is a middle distance track and field running event.  It is a standardized event in track meets conducted by the NFHS in American high school competition.  When the organization went through metrication, finalized with their 1980 rule book, the 4 lap around a 440 yard, Imperial measured mile run, was replaced by the closest metric distance, 4 laps around a 400 meter track.  That decision is not without controversy.  The race is 9.344 meters shorter.  Other organizations have followed the lead of the IAAF and use the 1500 meters as the closest equivalent.

The current male high school record holder in the 1600 is Alan Webb from South Lakes High School in Reston, Virginia.  He ran 3:59.51 at the Arcadia Invitational against high school athletes on April 14, 2001.  Six weeks later, while running a mile against seasoned international runners at the Prefontaine Classic, he was timed in 3:51.83.  Many, including Track and Field News recognize the faster time, since he was technically still in high school at the time, but NFHS only recognizes the race against other high school competitors.  The female record is less disputed as Alexa Efraimson from Camas High School in Camas, Washington ran her 4:33.29 at the Washington State 4A Championships exclusively against other high school girls.

1600 meters is also the distance of the final leg of a distance medley relay, because it is an even 4 laps where at 3.75 laps, the 1500 would require the start line or finish line to be moved.

The term when used in the phrase 1600 meter relay, usually is referring to the 4x400 meter relay, however the 2-2-4-8 version of the sprint medley relay is also 1600 meters.

References

Events in track and field
Middle-distance running